Since the inception of international association football matches in 1872, 58 England male footballers have scored three or more goals (a hat-trick) in a game. The first players to score a hat-trick for England were Howard Vaughton and Arthur Alfred Brown, both Aston Villa players; in a friendly match against Ireland in 1882, they scored nine goals between them. Four players, Vaughton, Steve Bloomer, Willie Hall and Malcolm Macdonald, have scored five goals in one match. Jimmy Greaves has scored the greatest number of hat-tricks, with six.  Five players, Albert Allen, Frank Bradshaw, Walter Gilliat, John Veitch and John Yates, have scored hat-tricks on their only international appearance.

In the 1966 FIFA World Cup Final, Geoff Hurst scored a hat-trick, generally considered one of the most famous of all time. The most recent hat-trick was scored by Harry Kane in a World Cup qualifier against San Marino in November 2021.

England have conceded eleven hat-tricks since 1872, the most recent being scored by Zlatan Ibrahimović who scored four goals in a 4–2 defeat by Sweden in a friendly match in November 2012. Richard Hofmann was the first player from outside the Home Nations to score a hat-trick against England, scoring three times for Germany in a friendly match in May 1930. Previously only the Scottish players John McDougall, George Ker, John Smith, Robert Smyth McColl and Alex Jackson had scored hat-tricks against England.

Hat-tricks for England
Wartime internationals, not regarded as official matches, are not included in the list.

Hat-tricks conceded by England

England have conceded eleven hat-tricks, the first five of which were scored by players from Scotland. England have lost ten of the eleven matches in which they have conceded a hat-trick; the other was a 3–3 draw against Germany in 1930.

Statistics
The following table lists the number of hat-tricks scored by Englishplayers who have scored two or more hat-tricks.

See also 
 England national football team records and statistics
 List of England national amateur football team hat-tricks
 List of Scotland national football team hat-tricks
 List of Wales national football team hat-tricks
 List of Republic of Ireland national football team hat-tricks
 List of Germany national football team hat-tricks
 List of France national football team hat-tricks
 List of Spain national football team hat-tricks
 List of Portugal national football team hat-tricks

References

hat-trick
England
Association football player non-biographical articles